Telisha is one of two cantillation marks found in the Torah, Haftarah, and other books of the Hebrew Bible. There are two versions of the Telisha: Telisha ketana and Telisha gedola, the latter of which has a longer melody and higher peak. The Telisha trope can occur independently or can follow a Pazer or one of several other trope sounds. The Telisha ketana must be followed by a Kadma.

The Hebrew word  translates into English as detached.

The Telisha gedola can be found in the Torah 266 times. The Telisha ketana occurs 451 times.

Total occurrences

Melody
While the names "Telisha Ketana" and "Telisha Gedola" are 6 syllables each, they are usually applied to words with far fewer syllables, often just one. In one-syllable words, only the notes leading to and from the peak are included. In multiple-syllable words, the additional syllables are recited at the level of the first note leading up to the peak.

Telisha Ketana

Telisha Gedola

References

Cantillation marks